Acraea overlaeti is a butterfly in the family Nymphalidae. It is found in the Democratic Republic of the Congo (Shaba). 
See Pierre & Bernaud, 2014  for taxonomy.

References

Butterflies described in 1988
overlaeti
Endemic fauna of the Democratic Republic of the Congo
Butterflies of Africa